Bayou Academy is a non-profit school located in unincorporated Bolivar County, Mississippi, near the City of Cleveland on Highway 8. The school serves about 500 students in grades Pre-Kindergarten through 12.
The school is accredited by the Midsouth Association of Independent Schools.

History
Bayou Academy was founded in 1964 as a segregation academy. In 1966, the all-white school board sold Skene Attendance Center to a white group called Skene Civic Improvement Society, Inc. for $1.00. The property was then leased to Bolivar Academy, achieving a transfer of public property to the segregationist group. After the United States Supreme Court decided Alexander v. Holmes County Board of Education in 1969, ordering the desegregation of public schools in the South, the all-white Bayou Academy doubled its enrollment for the 1970 school year. In 2009, the old Skene school building burned to the ground.

In 2021 the elementary school principal was arrested for placing a camera in the girls locker room.

Of the 372 students who attended in the 2011–2012 school year, 99 percent were white.

Sports 
Bayou Academy Elementary hosts several sports for different grades including: cross country (boys and girls), swim (boys and girls), peewee basketball (boys and girls), peewee cheer (girls), peewee football (boys).  The sports in Bayou Academy high school register in grades starting at 7th grade and ends with 12th grade. The following sports are played by both male and female: Track, cross country, basketball, golf, soccer, swimming, tennis. The next few sports are male only: Football, baseball. The following sports are female only: Cheer, softball

References

External links

 Bayou Academy

Schools in Bolivar County, Mississippi
Educational institutions established in 1964
Private K-12 schools in Mississippi
Segregation academies in Mississippi
1964 establishments in Mississippi